Marian Oprea (born 6 June 1982) is a Romanian athlete, competing in triple jump, who won the silver medal at the 2004 Olympic Games. His personal best is 17.81 meters.

Oprea was born in Piteşti. He took his first major medal at the 2000 World Junior Championships in Athletics, winning the gold with a jump of 16.41 m. Oprea won the bronze medal in the triple jump at the 2005 World Athletics Championships in Helsinki and also at the 2006 European Athletics Championships in Gothenburg.

He suffered a serious knee injury (tendonitis) and missed the 2009 World Championships in Athletics as a result. He opted to undergo major surgery and brought an end to a two-year-long injury hiatus with a jump of 16.88 m in May 2010. He proved himself to return to peak fitness with a silver medal performance at the 2010 European Athletics Championships (jumping 17.51 m) and then taking the gold medal at the 2010 IAAF Continental Cup later that season.

Achievements

References

External links

1982 births
Living people
Athletes (track and field) at the 2004 Summer Olympics
Athletes (track and field) at the 2008 Summer Olympics
Athletes (track and field) at the 2016 Summer Olympics
Olympic athletes of Romania
Olympic silver medalists for Romania
Sportspeople from Pitești
Romanian male triple jumpers
World Athletics Championships medalists
European Athletics Championships medalists
World Athletics Championships athletes for Romania
Medalists at the 2004 Summer Olympics
Olympic silver medalists in athletics (track and field)
Universiade medalists in athletics (track and field)
Olympic male triple jumpers
Universiade silver medalists for Romania
IAAF Continental Cup winners
Medalists at the 2001 Summer Universiade